Suzanne Allison Davis is an American attorney and academic administrator serving as the 13th president of Greenville University, a liberal arts university in Greenville, Illinois affiliated with the [[Council for Christian Colleges and Universities

Education 
Davis earned a Bachelor of Arts degree in philosophy and political science from Greenville University in 2000. She earned a Master of Business Administration from the Gies College of Business and a Juris Doctor from the University of Illinois College of Law.

Career 
After graduating from law school, Davis practiced civil law in Tuscola, Illinois and worked as a professor of business at Eastern Illinois University. In 2012, Davis returned to Greenville University, serving as the chief of staff to then-president Ivan Filby. She later served as founding dean of the university's business school and vice president for university relations. In May 2020, she was named acting president after the resignation of Filby.

References 

Living people
Greenville College alumni
Greenville College people
Gies College of Business alumni
University of Illinois Urbana-Champaign alumni
University of Illinois College of Law alumni
Illinois lawyers
Eastern Illinois University faculty
American academic administrators
Heads of universities and colleges in the United States
Year of birth missing (living people)